Laura Lerchová is a Czech ice hockey forward currently playing for the Czech national team. In April 2020, she announced that she was leaving SDHL club Modo Hockey after two years.

References

External links
 Biographical information and career statistics from Elite Prospects

Modo Hockey players
2000 births
Living people
Sportspeople from Třinec
Czech women's ice hockey forwards
Ice hockey players at the 2016 Winter Youth Olympics
Czech expatriate ice hockey players in Sweden